The following is a comparative list of wearable devices using the Wear OS operating system.

See also

References

Wear OS software